Klaus Peter Sauer (2 February 1941 – 12 November 2022) was a German evolutionary biologist and ecologist.

Biography
From 1969 to 1971, he was a research assistant at Giessen and from 1971 to 1979, a research assistant of Günther Osche at the University of Freiburg. In 1979, he was appointed chair of evolutionary research at Bielefeld University.

In 1992, Sauer became head of the Institute for Evolutionary Biology and Ecology at the University of Bonn. From 1993 to 1999, he was coordinator of the German Research Foundation program Genetische Analyse von Sozialsystemen and was spokesperson of the Genetische Analyse von Sozialsystemen program from 2002 to 2004. He retired in 2008.

Sauer died on 12 November 2022, at the age of 81.

Honors
Liaison lecturer of the Studienstiftung (1977–1979, 1990–1992)
Deputy Chairman of the Deutsche Zoologische Gesellschaft (1991–1993)
President of the Deutsche Zoologische Gesellschaft (1994–1996)
Member of the German National Academy of Sciences Leopoldina (since 1999)

References

1941 births
2022 deaths
German ecologists
German zoologists
Evolutionary biologists
University of Giessen alumni
Academic staff of the University of Bonn
Academic staff of Bielefeld University
People from Frankfurt